The 2011 Big 12 Conference women's basketball tournament, known for sponsorship reasons as the 2011 Phillips 66 Big 12 Women's Basketball Championship, was the 2011 edition of the Big 12 Conference's championship tournament.  The tournament was held at the Municipal Auditorium in Kansas City from 8 March until 12 March 2011.  The Quarterfinals, Semifinals, and Finals were televised on Fox Sports Net. The championship game, held on March 12, 2011, featured the number 1 seeded Baylor Lady Bears, and the number 2 seeded Texas A&M Aggies. Baylor won the contest by a 61-58 margin.

Seeding

Schedule

Tournament bracket
 Times listed are Central Standard Time zone.

All-Tournament team
Most Outstanding Player – Brittney Griner, Baylor

See also
2011 Big 12 Conference men's basketball tournament
2011 NCAA Women's Division I Basketball Tournament
2010–11 NCAA Division I women's basketball rankings

References

External links
 Official 2010 Big 12 Women's Basketball Tournament Bracket

Big 12
Big 12 Conference women's basketball tournament
Tournament
Big 12 Conference women's basketball tournament
Big 12 Conference women's basketball tournament